Protein BTG3 is a protein that in humans is encoded by the BTG3 gene.

The protein encoded by this gene is a member of the BTG/Tob family. This family has structurally related proteins that appear to have antiproliferative properties. This encoded protein might play a role in neurogenesis in the central nervous system.

References

External links

Further reading